Kush were Australian rock band in the early 1970s. They released two studio albums.

Discography

Studio albums

Singles

References

Australian rock music groups